The articularis genus (also known as the subcrureus muscle) is a small skeletal muscle located anteriorly on the thigh just above the knee.

Structure

It arises from the anterior surface of the lower part of the body of the femur, deep to the vastus intermedius, close to the knee and from the deep fibers of the vastus intermedius.

Its insertion is on the synovial membrane of the knee-joint.

Blood supply 

It is supplied by the lateral femoral circumflex artery.

Innervation 

It is innervated by branches of the femoral nerve (L2-L4).

Variation 

Flat, wispy and highly variable, sometimes consisting of several separate muscular bundles, this muscle is without a distinct investing fascia and ranges 1.5–3 cm in width.

It is usually distinct from the vastus intermedius, but occasionally blended with it.

Function
Articularis genus pulls the suprapatellar bursa superiorly during extension of the knee, and prevents impingement of the synovial membrane between the patella and the femur.

References

External links 
 Farshchian's Orthopedic Regenerative Series: The Knee; Articularis Genus (very clear illustration)

Muscles of the lower limb